Hubert Yves Adrian Giraud (3 March 1920 – 16 January 2016) was a French composer and lyricist.

Career
Giraud began his career playing the harmonica with Django Reinhardt's jazz group, the Quintette du Hot Club de France. In 1941, he was recruited by Ray Ventura to play the guitar during Ventura's big-band tour of South America. Six years later, he joined Jacques Hélian's orchestra in scoring a series of post-war romantic comedy films, including Georges Combert's 1951 feature, Musique en tête.

His song "Dors, mon amour", performed by André Claveau, won the Eurovision Song Contest 1958.

Giraud (with lyricist Pierre Cour) wrote the song "Gitans" ( "Les Gitans"). It was further translated into English by B. Guilgud (a.k.a. Guilgudo) and A. Gill and recorded by Corry Brokken. Sergio Franchi recorded an English and Italian version (Italian lyrics by Leo Chiosso) on his 1965 RCA album Live at the Cocoanut Grove.

Giraud also wrote the music for the songs "Sous le ciel de Paris" in 1951 and "Mamy Blue" in 1970.

Selected filmography
 The Fighting Drummer (1953)
 The Triumph of Michael Strogoff (1961)

See also

 List of big band musicians
 List of French composers
 List of jazz musicians
 List of songwriters

References

External links 
 
 

1920 births
2016 deaths
Musicians from Marseille
20th-century French composers
Big bands
Eurovision Song Contest winners
French film score composers
French male film score composers
French guitarists
French male guitarists
French jazz musicians
French songwriters
Male songwriters
Jazz harmonica players
20th-century guitarists
20th-century French male musicians
French male jazz musicians